Offord and Buckden railway station was built by the Great Northern Railway to serve the twin villages of Offord Cluny and Offord D'Arcy in Cambridgeshire, England.

History

A station between these, named Offord, was opened just over a year later, in September 1851.

On 1 August 1876 the station was renamed Offord and Buckden.

The station closed for passengers on 2 February 1959.

Route

Notes

References

Disused railway stations in Cambridgeshire
Former Great Northern Railway stations
Railway stations in Great Britain opened in 1851
Railway stations in Great Britain closed in 1959
1851 establishments in England